German Society for Aeronautics and Astronautics (DGLR) is a German aerospace society. It was founded in 1912 under the name of Wissenschaftliche Gesellschaft für Flugtechnik (WGF). It is the second oldest technical and scientific society in aerospace in the world.

The DGLR published some of the Zeitschrift für Flugtechnik und Motorluftschiffahrt (ZFM) ("Journal of Aviation Engineering and Motorized-Airship Aeronautics") until 1933

History
In 1993 Hermann-Oberth-Gesellschaft, Otto-Lilienthal-Gesellschaft, Gesellschaft für Raketentechnik und Weltraumfahrt e.V. and Fachverband für Luftfahrt e.V. were combined to form Deutschen Gesellschaft für Luft- und Raumfahrt - Lilienthal - Oberth e.V.

Awards
The following awards are given out by DGLR for outstanding contributions:
 Ludwig-Prandtl-Ring
 Eugen-Sänger-Medaille
 Otto-Lilienthal-Medaille

See also
German Aerospace Center

References

Aerospace engineering organizations
Aviation in Germany
Organisations based in Bonn